Mohammad Ramzi bin Sufian (born 1 March 1994) is a Malaysian professional footballer who plays for Terengganu II in the Malaysia Premier League. He plays as a striker.

Youth career
At the age of 20, Ramzi made his professional footballing debut with Harimau Muda B. He has since scored a total of 8 goals in 15 matches.

Ramzi scored an equaliser against Tampines in the 120th minute of the extra time in the 2014 Singapore Cup preliminary round to cancel out Noh Alam Shah's strike in the 117th minute, but exited the competition on penalties.

References

External links
 
 Ramzi Sufian ifball.com

1994 births
Living people
Malaysian people of Malay descent
People from Terengganu
Terengganu F.C. II players
Malaysian footballers
Association football forwards